Summer Is Over may refer to:

"Summer Is Over" (Dusty Springfield song), 1964
Summer Is Over (film), 1963 Soviet comedy film
"Summer Is Over" (KSI song), 2022

See also 
"Summers Over Interlude", song by Drake on the 2016 album Views
 "Summer's Here", song by James Taylor, 1981
Summer's Gone (disambiguation)